Birds is the third studio album by New Zealand artist Bic Runga. The album was released in New Zealand on 28 November 2005. The album was Bic's third no.1 album garnering platinum status in its first week. The album was certified 3× platinum. The album won the New Zealand Music Award for Album of the Year in 2006, her second award for Best Album, after her debut release Drive.

Track listing
"Winning Arrow" – 2:53
"Say After Me" – 4:36
"Listen" – 3:32
"Birds" – 3:46
"Ruby Nights" – 4:23
"No Crying No More" – 2:03
"If I Had You" – 4:48
"Captured" – 6:03
"That's Alright" – 3:22
"Blue Blue Heart" – 3:32
"It's Over" – 5:38

Limited Australian Tour Edition
The Australian release included a second disc of live material recorded at the Civic Theatre in November 2005. The disc incorrectly identifies the recording date as November 2006 — eight months after the release of this edition.

"Birds" – 4:30
"Blue Blue Heart" – 3:48
"Ruby Nights" – 4:42
"Listen" – 3:38
"The Be All And End All" – 3:51

International version
Features an alternate track listing.

"Captured" – 6:03
"Birds" (with birds intro) – 3:58
"No Crying No More" – 2:03
"Winning Arrow" – 2:53
"If I Had You" – 4:48
"Say After Me" – 4:36
"Listen" – 3:32
"That's Alright" – 3:22
"Blue Blue Heart" – 3:32
"Ruby Nights" – 4:23
"It's Over" – 5:38
"Somewhere in the Night" – 4:06

Special Edition
Released in NZ with 2 bonus tracks (Somewhere in the Night and Something's Gotten Hold of My Heart (Birds Version)) plus a DVD featuring 5 live performances and 2 music videos.

DVD:
"Birds"
"Blue Blue Heart"
"Ruby Nights"
"No Crying No More"
"Captured"
"Winning Arrow" (music video)
"Say After Me" (music video)

Chart positions

Weekly charts

End of year Charts

Performers
Bic Runga – vocals, guitars
Tim Arnold – guitar
Ben "Boxcar" Maitland – vocals, guitars, harmonica
Shayne Carter – backing vocals
Anna Coddington – backing vocals
Neil Finn – vocals, guitars, piano, psalterian, vibraphone
Riki Gooch – drums, percussion
Rebecca Harris – harp
Anika Moa – backing vocals
Joanna Satomi Schulz – French horn
Conrad Standish – vocals, bass guitar

Strings
Miranda Adams
Mark Bennett
Christine Bowie
Artur Grabczewski
Greg McGarity
William Hanfling
Claudia Price
Katherine Uren

Additional
Paul Crowther – drum tech
Neil Finn – string arrangements
Paul Jeffery – studio monitors
Tom Rainey – string arrangements
Marc Taddei – conductor
John Walsh – guitar tech

See also
 List of number-one albums from the 2000s (New Zealand)

References

External links
Bic Runga's official website
New Zealand Herald's album of the year

2005 albums
Bic Runga albums